Ville Heponiemi (born September 12, 1995) is a Finnish professional ice hockey player. He is currently playing for Ilves of the Finnish Liiga.

Heponiemi made his Liiga debut playing with Ilves during the 2014–15 Liiga season.

References

External links

1995 births
Living people
Finnish ice hockey forwards
Ilves players
Ice hockey people from Tampere